Chicago Fringe Festival was an annual performing arts festival showcasing traditional and non-traditional performances.  CFF aimed to provide a space for artists to produce shows that would not otherwise be seen and a festival that was accessible to everyone.

History
All Fringe Festivals trace their roots to the Edinburgh Festival Fringe which began in 1947.

After producing shows at the New York International Fringe Festival and Minnesota Fringe Festival, Executive Producer Sarah Mikayla Brown (previously Managing Director of Tantalus Theatre Group) wanted to bring that kind of "glorious chaos" to Chicago.  Chicago Fringe Festival was founded on December 30, 2008.

The inaugural festival attracted 156 applicants.  A total of 46 groups (23 local and 23 non-local) performed in eight non-traditional venues in Pilsen in September, 2010. After three years in Pilsen, CFF moved to Jefferson Park  for the 2013 festival.

The festival ended programming in 2019 after 10 years of performances.

Past performers 
 Barrel of Monkeys Productions
 Duplicity Ensemble
 Instinct Theatre
 The League of Miscreants
 Mari DeOleo
 New Light Theatre Project
 Oracle Productions
 Our Fair City
 Po' Chop
 Rebecca Kling
 Royal Kung Foolery
 Spartan Theatre Company

References

External links
 
 United States Association of Fringe's Official Website 

Fringe festivals in the United States
Festivals in Chicago
Festivals established in 2009
2009 establishments in Illinois